Wakefield is an unincorporated community in Spencer County, Kentucky, United States. Wakefield lies on Kentucky Route 55 midway between Taylorsville and Bloomfield.

Wakefield was named after Wakefield Farm, a nineteenth-century homestead. William Clarke Quantrill, a Confederate raid leader, was ambushed and killed by Union troops at Wakefield Farm in May 1865.

Country musician Bill Carlisle was born at Wakefield in 1908.

Footnotes

Unincorporated communities in Spencer County, Kentucky
Unincorporated communities in Kentucky